Naumikha is a rural locality (a village) in Nizhne-Vazhskoye Rural Settlement, Verkhovazhsky District, Vologda Oblast, Russia. The population was 251 as of 2002. There are 6 streets.

Geography 
Naumikha is located 2 km north of Verkhovazhye (the district's administrative centre) by road. Verkhovazhye is the nearest rural locality.

References 

Rural localities in Verkhovazhsky District